Soo Keng Yeoh is a Malaysian business executive, and civil engineer. In 2017, her net worth was estimated to be RM 323.99.

Life
She is the daughter of Yeoh Tiong Lay and  Tan Kai Yong. She graduated from Leeds University. She was a Project director at Yeoh Tiong Lay Plaza, the Pahang Cement plant, and Slag Cement plant.

She was an Executive Director of YTL Cement. She is a Director of Pahang Cement Marketing, and Perak-Hanjoong Simen. 
She is Executive Director at YTL Power Intl.

References 

Malaysian business executives
Living people
Year of birth missing (living people)